James Dixon Robinson III (born 19 November 1935) is an American businessman best known for his position as the chief executive officer of American Express Co. from 1977 until his retirement in 1993.

Education
Robinson attended Woodberry Forest School and is a 1957 graduate of Georgia Tech's School of Industrial Management where he was a member of the Chi Phi fraternity. He earned an MBA from Harvard in 1961.

Business career

American Express
James D. Robinson III served as Chairman & CEO of the American Express Company for approximately 16 years. He held additional positions at the company prior to that. While at American Express, Robinson achieved the senior position at the company after his competitor for the position, Robert Morley, launched a thwarted hostile takeover of McGraw-Hill.  Robinson went on to purchase Shearson Lehman, IDS, First Data Corporation, Trade Development Bank (Switzerland), and several others. He co-created Warner-Amex with Steve Ross. He played a prominent role in the RJR Nabisco leveraged buyout battle as chronicled in the book Barbarians at the Gate. Actor Fred Thompson played Robinson in the 1993 movie.

By the end of Robinson's tenure, he acknowledged that it had not gone well, saying that his "major miscalculation was ‘a focus on overly rapid growth.'"

Other positions
Robinson has been a director of The Coca-Cola Company since 1975. He is a general partner and co-founder of RRE Ventures, a private information technology venture investment firm, along with his son, James D. Robinson IV, a venture capitalist, and a classmate of his son from Harvard Business School, Stuart J. Ellman. Robinson is also president of J.D. Robinson, Inc., a strategic consulting firm. He was previously a long-time Director and Chairman of Bristol-Myers Squibb, and of Violy, Byorum & Partners, which operated in South America.

Robinson also serves on the Boards of Directors of PrimeRevenue, and is honorary chairman of the Memorial Sloan-Kettering Cancer Center. Robinson is a member of the Business Council and the Council on Foreign Relations, and an honorary trustee of the Brookings Institution and World Travel & Tourism Council, where he was a co-founder. In previous years, he served as co-chairman of the Business Roundtable and chairman of the Advisory Committee on Trade Policy and Negotiations. He is currently a member of investment bank Jefferies' Global Senior Advisory Board.

Personal life
Both Robinson and his son James D. Robinson IV are members of the Augusta National Golf Club.

In 1991, Robinson received the Golden Plate Award of the American Academy of Achievement presented by Awards Council member Henry Kravis.

Robinson married Linda Gosden Robinson in July 1984. They have two children together.

References

External links
Biography on the RRE website
Profile on Forbes
BusinessWeek profile

1935 births
Living people
Directors of The Coca-Cola Company
Georgia Tech alumni
American Express people
Place of birth missing (living people)
Harvard Business School alumni
Woodberry Forest School alumni
Businesspeople from Atlanta